Pilgrim Uniting Church is a church in the heart of the City on Flinders Street, Adelaide in South Australia. It is a church of the Uniting Church in Australia.

Social justice, as articulated by the Uniting Church in Australia in the inaugural Statement to the Nation (1977), and the Statement to the Nation (1988) for Australia's Bicentennial celebrations, is at the basis of the church's work. Pilgrim offers music programs to the public, and has the largest organ in Adelaide.

History

Pirie Street Wesleyan Church
The congregation was originally at the Gawler Place Wesleyan Chapel. The first minister at the Pirie Street site was Daniel Draper. The first service was held on 19 October 1852.

William Bowen Chinner was organist and choirmaster at Pirie Street from 1869 to around 1899. His nephew Norman Chinner filled the same positions from 1939.

Stow Memorial Church
The first Congregational chapel in South Australia was a temporary structure on North Terrace. George Strickland Kingston was the architect for a building in Freeman Street (now Gawler Place), with the congregation then moving to the Flinders Street site.

Stow Memorial Church, at 12 Flinders Street, Adelaide, was named in memory of the Reverend Thomas Quinton Stow, who had officiated at the first service in a tent on Adelaide's Park Lands in October 1837. The foundation stone was laid on 7 February 1865 and the inaugural worship service was held on 12 April 1867. The first minister was Cadwallader William Evan. The organist, who served for 45 years, was James Shakespeare.

Union Church in the City
Pirie Street Methodist and Stow Memorial congregations united on 1 June 1969 to form the Union Church in the City. In November 1975 the church changed its name to become Pilgrim Church. The congregation joined the Uniting Church at its inauguration in 1977.

Buildings

Pirie Street
The foundation stone for the Pirie Street Wesleyan Chapel was laid on 15 July 1850. The church was designed by Henry Stuckey. Completion of the building, after Henry Stuckey's death in 1851, was under the supervision of Edmund Wright,

After the merger of the two congregations the building was bought by the Adelaide City Council and demolished in 1976. Wright was also the architect of the Methodist Meeting Hall, located between the Pirie Street and Flinders Street churches. The hall was built in 1862 and is the only remaining part of the Pirie Street property and is now part of the Adelaide Town Hall complex.

Flinders Street
Stow Memorial Church, at 12 Flinders Street, Adelaide, had its foundation stone laid on 7 February 1865. It was designed in the Revival Gothic style. by Robert George Thomas, who was among the first colonists, arriving in South Australia in 1836 aged 16 years.

Stow Hall, built 1872 alongside at 16 Flinders Street, has been a popular venue for amateur theatre productions.

Gallery

Organs
The organ in the Flinders Street building was initially installed in 1855 in the Pirie Street building with that from Flinders Street being sold to St John's Lutheran Church in Malvern. Improvements over the years have made it the largest organ in the state of South Australia.

Notable people

Pirie Street Methodist Church
Henry Adams
John Colton
 Mary Colton
John Langdon Bonython
Daniel Draper
Benjamin Gould
Frank Hambly
John Hill
Henry Howard (Minister 1902–1921)
James Wedlock

Stow Memorial Church
Mostyn Evan
Matthew Goode
William Muirden
William Parkin
Arthur William Piper
James Zimri Sellar
Thomas Hyland Smeaton
Charles Todd
George Wright (1917–1975), a judge of the Supreme Court of Western Australia, was the son of the Reverend George H. Wright, a minister at the Stow Memorial Church
William Roby Fletcher, minister, appointed 1876
Alfred Depledge Sykes, minister 1904–1906 and 1907–1913

Pilgrim Uniting Church
Judith Blake
thea Gaia
Basil Hetzel
Penny Wong

Laneway renaming
In August 2022, the City of Adelaide renamed the laneway adjacent to the church, formerly Pilgrim Lane, to Paul Kelly Lane, after Paul Kelly, a well-known musician who grew up in Norwood. This was the fourth such renaming by the council, to honour musicians associated with the city.

References

External links
 Official website

Uniting churches in South Australia
Churches in Adelaide
Methodist churches in Australia
Congregational churches
South Australian Heritage Register
Gothic Revival architecture in Adelaide
Gothic Revival church buildings in Australia